Thomas Marian Paciorek (born November 2, 1946) is a former outfielder and first baseman who spent 18 seasons in Major League Baseball (MLB) with the Los Angeles Dodgers (1970–1975), Atlanta Braves (1976–1978), Seattle Mariners (1978–1981), Chicago White Sox (1982–1985), New York Mets (1985) and Texas Rangers (1986–1987). He appeared twice in the postseason, with the National League (NL) champion Dodgers in 1974 and the American League (AL) West-winning White Sox in 1983.

Following his retirement as an active player, he worked as a color commentator for various MLB clubs, most notably the White Sox, on whose telecasts he was teamed with Ken Harrelson throughout the 1990s. Paciorek was known by the nickname "Wimpy," which was given to him by Tommy Lasorda after a dinner with minor league teammates in which he was the only one to order a hamburger instead of steak.

Collegiate career
After graduating from St. Ladislaus High School in Hamtramck, Michigan, Paciorek played baseball and football for the University of Houston from 1965 to 1968.  A defensive back, he was picked by the Miami Dolphins in the ninth round of the 1968 NFL/AFL Draft. In baseball, he was named to the All-Tournament team after the Cougars reached the finals of the 1967 College World Series, and were the national runner-up to Arizona State. Paciorek's number is one of only three to be retired by the Cougars.

Major league career
He was selected by the Los Angeles Dodgers in the 1968 Major League Baseball draft, one of 14 players drafted by the Dodgers that year to reach the majors.  A top prospect, he won The Sporting News Minor League Player of the Year Award in 1972 with the Triple-A Albuquerque Dukes.  He spent the 1973 through 1975 seasons as a fourth outfielder and pinch hitter.  After hitting under .200 in 1975, he was traded to the Atlanta Braves as part of a trade for Dusty Baker.  He hit .290 in a platoon role for Atlanta in 1976 but he struggled to duplicate those numbers the following year.

The Braves released him after spring training in 1978, but re-signed him just a week later.  However, after six weeks and only nine at bats (with three hits), the Braves gave him his release a second time in May. Paciorek signed with the Seattle Mariners, for whom he hit .299 over seventy games.

Following two solid years as a platoon player, Paciorek put together a career season with the Mariners in 1981.  Playing full-time for the only time in his career at age 34, Paciorek batted .326, second in the American League, and was fourth in the AL in slugging percentage.  He earned his only appearance to an All-Star team at the 1981 Major League Baseball All-Star Game and was tenth in the AL MVP race.

After he requested increased compensation and a three-year contract, the Mariners traded Paciorek in December to the Chicago White Sox for Rod Allen, Todd Cruz and Jim Essian. He hit over .300 his first two years with the Sox, and was part of Chicago's division championship team in 1983.

With the White Sox in 1984, Paciorek replaced Ron Kittle in left field in the fourth inning of their game with the Milwaukee Brewers on May 8 – a game which went 25 innings, and was  the longest game in major league history, as measured by time on the field.  When it ended the following day, Paciorek had amassed five hits in nine at bats, a record for most hits in a game by a non-starting player which still stands.

He was traded to the New York Mets in 1985, then spent his final two years with the Texas Rangers.

Tom was one of three brothers to play in the majors.  His younger brother Jim played for the Milwaukee Brewers in 1987, while older brother John played one game for the Houston Colt .45s in 1963.

Career statistics

Paciorek played 397 games at first base, 23 games at third base, 1 game at shortstop, 483 games in left field, 74 games in center field and 281 games in right field. His best position was at first base, recording a .994 fielding percentage.

After baseball
Paciorek has served as a broadcaster for several years since retiring as a player, with his most notable stint as the color commentator on White Sox television broadcasts alongside Ken Harrelson, who affectionately called him by his baseball nickname, "Wimpy", on-air. Paciorek broadcast for the White Sox from 1988 to 1999, then called selected games for the Detroit Tigers in 2000 and the Seattle Mariners in 2001 before calling the Atlanta Braves on FSN South from 2002 to 2005. In 2006, he was the color commentator for the Washington Nationals, but his contract was not renewed for 2007. He is fondly remembered amongst Nationals fans for his distinct pronunciation of "Alfonso Soriano," a Nationals outfielder that season: "Eelfahnso Soriaahno".

In 1992, Tom Paciorek was inducted into the National Polish-American Sports Hall of Fame.

In the spring of 2002, Paciorek told the Detroit Free Press that priest Gerald Shirilla had molested him and three of his four brothers while working as a teacher at St. Ladislaus High School in Hamtramck in the 1960s. "I was molested by him for a period of four years," Paciorek said. "I would refer to them as attacks. I would say there was at least a hundred of them." Paciorek said he didn't tell anyone because no one would have believed him, saying "When you're a kid, and you're not able to articulate, who's going to believe you?" and "The church back then was so powerful, there's nothing that a kid could do."

In 2016 Paciorek was named to the National College Baseball Hall of Fame.

See also
List of Washington Nationals broadcasters

References

External links

1946 births
Living people
All-American college baseball players
American League All-Stars
Atlanta Braves players
Atlanta Braves announcers
Baseball players from Detroit
Chicago White Sox announcers
Chicago White Sox players
Detroit Tigers announcers
Houston Cougars baseball players
Houston Cougars football players
Los Angeles Dodgers players
Major League Baseball broadcasters
Major League Baseball outfielders
New York Mets announcers
New York Mets players
Orlando Juice players
Sportspeople from Detroit
Seattle Mariners players
Texas Rangers players
Washington Nationals announcers
American people of Polish descent
Bakersfield Dodgers players
Ogden Dodgers players
Spokane Indians players
Albuquerque Dukes players
San Jose Missions players
Seattle Mariners announcers
Pacific Coast League MVP award winners
National College Baseball Hall of Fame inductees